Ait Milk is a small town and rural community in Chtouka-Aït Baha Province of the Souss-Massa region of Morocco.

Souk 
It is important for the nearby villages for its weekly market (souk) on Saturday. The weekly market is an opportunity for neighboring villages to buy and sell food and clothes as well as other goods.

Language 
Amazigh (Tasoisit ) is the local language of people

Demography 
At the time of the 2004 census, the community had a total population of 11414 people living in 2112 households. In 2014, the total population has decreased to reach 10277.

References

Populated places in Chtouka Aït Baha Province
Rural communes of Souss-Massa